The 1970 Tangerine Bowl was held on December 28, 1970, at the Tangerine Bowl stadium in Orlando, Florida. The game pitted the #15 AP-ranked Toledo Rockets against the William & Mary Indians (now the Tribe), and ended with a 40–12 victory for the Rockets. This was the 25th playing of the Tangerine Bowl, a former name of what is now called the Citrus Bowl.

Game summary
Although William & Mary scored first and last in the game, Toledo scored six touchdowns in-between, to win by a 28-point margin.  Toledo quarterback Chuck Ealey was named outstanding offensive player, while Vince Hubler of William & Mary was named outstanding defensive player.

Statistics

Scoring summary

References

Tangerine Bowl
Citrus Bowl (game)
Toledo Rockets football bowl games
William & Mary Tribe football bowl games
Tangerine Bowl
Tangerine Bowl